Mitis may refer to:

 La Mitis, a Regional County Municipality in Quebec, Canada
 Mitis River, a river in Matapedia Valley, Quebec, Canada
 Mitis Lake, a lake of the Zec de la Rivière-Mitis in Quebec, Canada